The 2010–11 All-Ireland Senior Club Football Championship was the 41st staging of the All-Ireland Senior Club Football Championship since its establishment by the Gaelic Athletic Association in 1970-71. The championship began on 17 October 2010 and ended on 17 March 2011.

St. Gall's entered the championship as the defending champions, however, they were beaten by Crossmaglen Rangers in the Ulster Club Championship.

On 17 March 2011, Crossmaglen Rangers won the championship following a 2-11 to 1-11 defeat of St. Brigid's in the All-Ireland final at Croke Park. It was their fifth championship title overall and their first title since 2007.

Crossmaglen's Oisín McConville was the championship's top scorer with 2-27.

Results

Connacht Senior Club Football Championship

Quarter-final

Semi-finals

Final

Leinster Senior Club Football Championship

First round

Quarter-finals

Semi-finals

Final

Munster Senior Club Football Championship

Quarter-finals

Semi-finals

Final

Ulster Senior Club Football Championship

Preliminary round

Quarter-finals

Semi-finals

Final

All-Ireland Senior Club Football Championship

Quarter-final

Semi-finals

Final

Championship statistics

Top scorers

Overall

In a single game

Miscellaneous

 The Leinster Club SFC quarter final match between Portlaoise and Moorefield took place in O'Moore Park and not in St. Conleth's Park where it was originally fixed for as Moorefield were serving a two-match ban from playing home games in the Leinster club championships following incidents in their last provincial club campaign back in 2007. Moorefield were involved in a melee in their quarter-final game against Longford champions Dromard and although Moorefield won that game, Leinster Council hit them with a two-match ban from playing home games. The first game of that was the semi-final against Westmeath's Tyrellspass but Moorefield lost that encounter and hadn't been in the Leinster championship since.

References

All-Ireland Senior Club Football Championship
All-Ireland Senior Club Football Championship
All-Ireland Senior Club Football Championship